The seventh Annual American Music Awards were held on January 18, 1980.

Winners and nominees

References
 http://www.rockonthenet.com/archive/1980/amas.htm

1980